Elections to the Puducherry Legislative Assembly were held in May 1985, to elect members of the 30 constituencies in Puducherry (then known as Pondicherry), in India. The Indian National Congress won the popular vote and the most seats, and M. O. H. Farook was appointed as the Chief Minister of Puducherry.

Results

Elected members

See also
List of constituencies of the Puducherry Legislative Assembly
1985 elections in India

References

External links
  

1985 State Assembly elections in India
State Assembly elections in Puducherry
1980s in Pondicherry